Schwartz Tavern is a historic inn and tavern located at Blackstone, Nottoway County, Virginia. The original section was built about 1798, with two additions made by 1840.  It measures 99 feet long in three sections, with the middle block the oldest. The interior features Federal style decorative details and paneling.  It is Blackstone's oldest building.

The tavern has been restored and is open for tours.

It was listed on the National Register of Historic Places in 1974.

References

External links
 Schwartz Tavern - Blackstone Museums
Schwartz Tavern, 111 Tavern Street, Blackstone, Nottoway County, VA 1 photo at Historic American Buildings Survey

Buildings and structures in Nottoway County, Virginia
Museums in Nottoway County, Virginia
National Register of Historic Places in Nottoway County, Virginia
1798 establishments in Virginia
Historic American Buildings Survey in Virginia
Drinking establishments on the National Register of Historic Places in Virginia
Colonial architecture in Virginia
Federal architecture in Virginia
Commercial buildings completed in 1798
History museums in Virginia